Selenite may refer to:

Substances containing selenium
A selenium-containing anion or ionic compound with the SeO32− anion:
Selenite (ion), anion is a selenium oxoanion with the chemical formula SeO32−
Selenous acid, the conjugate acid, with the formula H2SeO3
Salts of this anion:
Silver selenite, an inorganic compound of formula Ag2SeO3
Sodium selenite, a salt, a colourless solid, and the most common water-soluble selenium compound
Selenite broth, an enrichment medium for the isolation of Salmonella species

Other
Selenite (mineral), a variety of gypsum (CaSO4·2H2O)
 Selenites is a synonym of Zophos, a genus of land snails in the family Haplotrematidae
 Selenite Range, a mountain range in Pershing County, Nevada
 Selenite Peak, a summit in the Selenite Range, Nevada
 Selenite, a high class citizen that experienced space travel, from the videogame Event_0
 Selenite, a fictional native inhabitant of the Moon;  see Moon in science fiction#Life on the Moon
 Selenitic Age, a fictional place in the game Myst

es:Selenitas